Renato de Araújo Chaves Júnior (born 4 May 1990), known as Renato Chaves or simply Renato, is a Brazilian professional footballer who plays for Juventude as a central defender.

Club career

Corinthians
Born in São Paulo, Renato joined Corinthians' youth setup in 2001, aged 11. In February 2008, after impressing in the previous years' Copa São Paulo de Futebol Júnior, he was promoted to the main squad.

Renato made his first team – and Série A – debut on 10 May 2009, starting in a 0–1 home loss against Internacional. He scored his first goal as a professional late in the month, but in a 1–3 away loss against Santos.

Loans to Bahia and Figueirense
On 16 August 2010 Renato was loaned to Bahia until the end of the year. After failing to adapt, he returned to his parent club only months later and moved to Figueirense in a one-year loan deal on 29 December.

Portuguesa
On 2 June 2011, after being rarely used, Renato moved to Série B side Portuguesa also in a temporary deal. He was signed permanently by Lusa in December 2011, after achieving promotion to the top level.

Atlético Paranaense
In July 2012, Renato joined Atlético Paranaense, back to the second tier. He was only a backup option for his new side, and struggled to even make the bench.

In February 2014, Renato refused to play with the under-23s in the year's Campeonato Paranaense, alleging he should be included in the first team squad; due to that, he was even more ostracized.

Loan to Náutico
In July 2014, after making only four appearances, Renato joined Náutico in the second tier, on loan until the end of the year.

Ponte Preta
After being regularly used, Renato joined Ponte Preta in December 2014, after his contract with Furacão expired. On 20 October 2015, after being a starter in the year's Brasileirão, he extended his contract for a further two years.

Fluminense
On 13 January 2016, Renato signed a three-year contract with Fluminense also in the top tier. In his first year, he was mainly used as a backup option to Gum and Henrique.

Al-Wehda
On 4 August 2018, Renato moved abroad for the first time in his career, and joined a host of compatriots at Al-Wehda. He immediately became a starter at his new side.

Al-Batin
On 5 October 2020, Renato signed for fellow Saudi Professional League side Al-Batin on a two-year deal.

Juventude
On 28 July 2022, Renato joined Juventude on a free transfer.

Career statistics

Titles
Corinthians
Campeonato Brasileiro Série B: 2008
Campeonato Paulista: 2009
Copa do Brasil: 2009

Portuguesa
Campeonato Brasileiro Série B: 2011

References

External links

1990 births
Living people
Footballers from São Paulo
Brazilian footballers
Association football defenders
Campeonato Brasileiro Série A players
Campeonato Brasileiro Série B players
Sport Club Corinthians Paulista players
Figueirense FC players
Associação Portuguesa de Desportos players
Club Athletico Paranaense players
Clube Náutico Capibaribe players
Associação Atlética Ponte Preta players
Fluminense FC players
Al-Wehda Club (Mecca) players
Al Batin FC players
Esporte Clube Juventude players
Saudi Professional League players
Brazilian expatriate sportspeople in Saudi Arabia
Expatriate footballers in Saudi Arabia